Andrew Cuomo, the 56th governor of New York, was accused of sexual harassment by multiple women starting in December 2020, with the accusations covering a range of alleged behavior. He denied all allegations and has apologized for his comments being interpreted as sexually charged. On February 28, 2021, New York Attorney General Letitia James announced that she would hire and deputize a law firm to conduct an independent investigation into the allegations. On March 11, the New York State Assembly authorized an impeachment investigation into the allegations. In August 2021, James released an investigatory report which stated that Cuomo sexually harassed 11 women during his time in office, with actions such as unwanted groping, kissing and sexual comments. The controversy surrounding these allegations culminated in Governor Cuomo's resignation from office.

The entire New York congressional delegation, including New York's two United States Senators, Majority Leader Chuck Schumer and Kirsten Gillibrand, and over 120 New York State legislators called for Cuomo's resignation, as did House Speaker Nancy Pelosi, Bill de Blasio, the mayor of New York City, and Eric Adams, the Brooklyn Borough President and Democratic nominee for Mayor of New York City. President Joe Biden stated his support for Attorney General James's independent investigation; he later called on Cuomo to resign after the investigatory report was released. On August 10, Cuomo announced that he would step down from office in 14 days, making his resignation effective on August 24.  Cuomo was replaced by Kathy Hochul.

On January 4, 2022, Albany County District Attorney David Soares dropped a criminal complaint against Cuomo and also announced that Cuomo would not face any other charges related to other groping allegations, citing lack of evidence. Three days later, a judge dropped the criminal charge against Cuomo. On January 31, 2022, the last of five criminal cases which had been pursued against Cuomo were dismissed.

Sexual harassment allegations 
Whether a behavior is sexual harassment depends upon a number of factors. The harassment can be:
 Severe: a single instance can be sexual harassment if it is sufficiently severe.
 Pervasive: a behavior can be sexual harassment if it is repeated frequently enough.
 Unwelcome: the harasser knows, or reasonably ought to know, that the behavior is not desired by the victim.
Additionally, retaliation against someone who submits a sexual harassment complaint is illegal.

Lindsey Boylan 

In December 2020, Lindsey Boylan, a former aide to New York Governor Andrew Cuomo, and then a candidate for Manhattan Borough President, accused him in a series of tweets of sexual harassment and creating a toxic environment. The New York Times published a link to Boylan's lengthy essay in Medium wherein she accused Cuomo of sexual harassment and "described several years of uncomfortable interactions." She said she resigned in 2018 after "he forcibly kissed her during a meeting." She also alleged that "he had compared her to a former girlfriend, and asked her to play strip poker." Cuomo has denied these allegations. In an interview, Boylan said Cuomo's questions and comments about sexual issues made her conclude, "The governor's trying to sleep with me."

On March 17, Boylan criticized Speaker of the New York State Assembly Carl Heastie and the New York State Assembly's impeachment investigation, tweeting “What would be the point of survivors talking to investigators of your sham investigation @CarlHeastie?” Boylan cooperated with the Attorney General of New York's independent investigation, and met with the investigators on March 16.

In an article written by Ronan Farrow in The New Yorker, Boylan also claimed Cuomo made an inappropriate comment concerning his new dog, Captain. After a February 2018 news conference, Cuomo's dog, a Shepherd-Malamute mix, jumped up and down near her. Boylan claims that Cuomo said, if he were a dog, he would try to "mount" her as well. Boylan said she remembered "being grossed out" and that it was "a dumb third-grade thing to say". She did not respond to Cuomo's remark, and said in the article: "I just shrugged it off."  A Cuomo spokesperson declined to comment.

Allegations of smearing and silencing Boylan 
On March 16, 2021, The New York Times reported that after Boylan accused Cuomo in December 2020, an open letter was circulated by people close to the governor that they attempted to get former staffers to sign, which suggested that her accusation was planned and for political reasons, among others  attempting to associate her name with supporters of Donald Trump. One source claimed that Cuomo himself was involved in its creation. The letter was never released. Boylan's personnel records were ultimately released to media organizations.

The Wall Street Journal reported that after Boylan's accusations came out, Cuomo's office called at least six former aides with questions related to Boylan, including whether they had been in contact with her. Some of those who were contacted stated that they felt the calls were a form of intimidation.

Charlotte Bennett 

In late February 2021, Charlotte Bennett, an executive assistant and health policy advisor to Cuomo, accused him of sexual harassment, which included questions about her sex life. In a March 5 video interview with CBS Evening News anchor Norah O'Donnell, Bennett said that during a one-on-one meeting in the governor's office on June 5, 2020, Cuomo implied "that I was old enough for him and he was lonely." Bennett went on to claim that Cuomo's office director took the state's mandatory sexual harassment training for him, "I was there. I heard [the office director] say, 'I can't believe I'm doing this for you' and making a joke about the fact that she was completing the training for him. And then I heard her at the end ask him to sign the certificate."

Anna Ruch 

In early March 2021, a third person, Anna Ruch, a member of the Obama administration (who later served on Joe Biden's presidential campaign), said that when they were speaking at a wedding reception Cuomo put a hand on her back, that she removed it, and that he then placed his hands on her face cheeks and asked if he could kiss her. A friend photographed Cuomo touching her face.

Ana Liss 

On March 6, 2021, Ana Liss, a policy and operations aide to Cuomo from 2013 to 2015, became the third former aide to accuse Cuomo of sexual harassment. Liss said Cuomo called her "sweetheart," touched her on her lower back while they were at a reception, and also once kissed her hand after she stood up from her desk.

Karen Hinton 

Also on March 6, Karen Hinton, a former press aide for Cuomo when he served as the US Secretary of Housing and Urban Development, said that in 2000, Cuomo had, while meeting with her in a California hotel room, hugged her in an "inappropriate" and "unethical" embrace. Hinton has more recently worked for Cuomo rival New York Mayor Bill de Blasio.

Brittany Commisso 

On March 9, 2021, the Times Union of Albany reported an anonymous member of the governor's Executive Chamber staff had accused Cuomo of inappropriate touching. On March 11, the same newspaper reported she said Cuomo called her to his mansion, reached under her blouse, and fondled her. Cuomo denied the allegation.

On April 7, 2021, an unnamed executive assistant to Cuomo alleged that she had been called to the governor's mansion in November 2020 to help Cuomo troubleshoot an issue with his phone. Cuomo allegedly groped her. After the aide told him his behavior would "get us in trouble[sic]," Cuomo then shut the door, said "I don't care", and groped one of her breasts. A month later she claimed that Cuomo told her to cover-up what had occurred. Her identity was revealed on August 8, 2021 as Brittany Commisso.

Kaitlin 

On March 12, Kaitlin (last name unreported), who formerly worked for the governor's office, alleged that Cuomo had made her feel uncomfortable in various situations, with his comments, questions, requests, and invasions of her personal space. She did not allege inappropriate touching or explicit sexual propositions.

Jessica Bakeman 

Jessica Bakeman, a former member of the Capitol press corps who worked for Politico New York, wrote about the atmosphere for women in Albany, New York. On March 12, for the New York magazine website, she wrote that Cuomo had touched her on her arms, shoulders, the small of her back, and waist in 2012, and put his arm around her back and his hand on her waist posing for a picture at a holiday party in 2014 (she wrote that "For years, I would relive that moment at the holiday party"), and made multiple "humiliating" comments during her time covering him. She wrote of the incident in 2014: "Keeping his grip on me as I practically squirmed to get away from him, the governor turned my body to face a different direction for yet another picture. He never let go of my hand."

Valerie Bauman 

On March 18, Valerie Bauman, a reporter for Bloomberg, said in a tweet that during Cuomo's tenure as New York Attorney General from 2007 to 2010, there was a period of "rampant sexism and sexual harassment." Cuomo allegedly also made her uncomfortable with unwanted flirting and eye contact. She also claimed that in 2007, upon meeting her, "He took my hand, entered my personal space and looked into my eyes as he announced, 'Hello, I’m Andrew Cuomo'".

Alyssa McGrath 

On March 19,  Alyssa McGrath, the first current employee to come forward publicly, spoke to The New York Times claiming Cuomo chronically ogled female aides like herself, commenting about their appearances in a way McGrath found inappropriate. McGrath also said that the aide who alleged Cuomo sexually assaulted her in the Executive Mansion "described the encounter in detail to her after it was made public in a report in the Times Union last week." McGrath claimed that Cuomo told her not to talk with the anonymous aide about the incident.

Sherry Vill 

During a March 29, 2021, Zoom news conference with an attorney, Sherry Vill alleged that Cuomo kissed her cheek in front of family members while visiting areas of Rochester damaged by a flood in May 2017. Vill said the kiss was of a "highly sexual manner.” Cuomo also kissed Vill on the cheek a second time in a “very aggressive manner."

Unnamed state trooper 

According to the August 2021 report, Cuomo met the state trooper in November 2017 and lobbied to hire her as part of his security detail despite her not satisfying the requirements for the post; she was indeed hired, and Cuomo later inappropriately touched her stomach and back, and also made inappropriate comments.

First unnamed state entity employee 

According to the August 2021 report, Cuomo met this unnamed state entity employee at an event in September 2019, where he tapped and grabbed her buttocks while they were posing for photographs.

Second unnamed state entity employee 

According to the August 2021 report, Cuomo in March 2020 made inappropriate comments to this unnamed state entity employee, a doctor, who had administered a nasal swab test on Cuomo at a press conference.

Virginia Limmiatis 

According to the August 2021 report, Cuomo met energy company employee Virginia Limmiatis at an event in May 2017, where he touched her chest with his fingers. Her case was dismissed by district attorney Greggory Oakes on January 31, 2022, the last one to be dropped, effectively clearing the former governor of all criminal charges.

Other witnesses 

According to the August 2021 report, other witnesses, in addition to the named complainants who came with specific instances, noted that Cuomo made comments or jokes that seemed sexual or suggestive in meetings with
staff from the Executive Chamber. One former staff member recalled hearing Cuomo repeatedly make a joke about how a young bull runs down the hill to have sex with one [cow] and the old bull walks down the hill to have sex with all of them, meaning that it is better to slow down and get a lot of things done. Cuomo denied recollection of this reported incident.

During the spring of 2016, Cuomo spotted a bottle on an executive assistant’s desk labeled "Skinny Bunny," with an accompanying image of rabbit ears. After learning the executive assistant was drinking Skinny Bunny Organic Matcha Tea in an attempt to lose weight in advance of her wedding, Cuomo asked the Executive Assistant if she was trying to look like a "Playboy Bunny".

Two witnesses also recounted that during a meeting, the Governor looked at his Emmy statuette, which he was awarded in November 2020 and put in his Albany office, and said something to the effect of, "look at her figure. Isn't she buxom?"

In December 2020 or in January 2021, the Governor was meeting with members of his staff to discuss a meeting with the White House related to COVID-19, when the Governor expressed disappointment that he did not have any "catchy oneliners" in his speech, and said something to the effect of, “You need to give me some catchy oneliners. '"Come up with a line like, 'you’re having sex without the orgasm'".

Reactions

Andrew Cuomo 
In a statement on February 28, Cuomo said:I now understand that my interactions may have been insensitive or too personal and that some of my comments, given my position, made others feel in ways I never intended . . . At work sometimes I think I am being playful and make jokes that I think are funny. I mean no offense and only attempt to add some levity and banter to what is a very serious business.

After the sixth accuser complaint, the governor's office declined to comment on the article or the alleged incident. Cuomo, speaking on a conference call with reporters on March 9, 2021 about an hour after the Times Union reported the latest accusation of inappropriate touching, said he was unaware of the new allegation, but reiterated previous declarations that he "never touched anybody inappropriately." On March 11, 2021, Cuomo attacked the lawmakers who have called for his resignation, calling them "reckless and dangerous" for telling him to resign without letting the investigations complete. Cuomo also attacked "cancel culture" and the lawmakers who bow to its pressure.

Political figures

Other reactions 
Speaker of the House Nancy Pelosi said in a statement to Fox News that "The women who have come forward with serious and credible charges against Gov. Cuomo deserve to be heard and to be treated with dignity."

Speaker of the New York State Assembly Carl Heastie urged Cuomo to "seriously consider whether he can effectively meet the needs of the people of New York."

Senate Majority Leader Chuck Schumer, speaking on Sirius XM satellite radio, called the allegations "nauseating". However, he initially stopped short of asking for Cuomo's resignation before doing so on March 12 with the other Senator from New York, Kirsten Gillibrand.

The New York Republican State Committee advocated for Cuomo's impeachment in a statement released March 12, writing "If I’ve said it once, I’ve said it a hundred times: we already have ample evidence that proves Andrew Cuomo is unfit to serve and anything short of a full impeachment is a complicit move to keep him as Governor."

New York State Legislature 

Members listed are members of the Democratic party unless otherwise noted.

The assembly announced that it would start an impeachment investigation, prior the governor's resignation announcement. There has been no official announcement as to whether that investigation will continue after he leaves office. The New York State Constitution does not prevent a former governor from being impeached and prevented from running for office again (if convicted by the senate).

Public opinion
Andrew Cuomo should resign

Andrew Cuomo should be impeached

Other
Some supporters of Cuomo have alleged a conspiracy theory that allegations against him were motivated on the basis of ousting him in order to bring a Republican to power who would proceed to "pardon" former President Donald Trump; this despite the fact that Cuomo's resignation would result in Democratic Lieutenant Governor Kathy Hochul ascending to the governorship (Hochul has run on four ballot lines: Democratic, Conservative, Independence, and Working Families Party).

Some Twitter users have compared the allegations against Cuomo to those against Al Franken, a Democratic Senator from Minnesota forced to resign over sexual harassment allegations in 2017. However, Inae Oh, writing for Mother Jones, argued that the allegations against Cuomo are much more serious, and that comparing the two minimizes the allegations and investigations against Cuomo.

Investigations

Attorney General-commissioned investigation 

In February 2021, Letitia James, the Attorney General of New York, announced that she would oversee an independent investigation into the accusations against Cuomo. In a statement, James said, "We will hire a law firm, deputize them as attorneys of our office, and oversee a rigorous and independent investigation." On June 24, 2021, The Wall Street Journal reported that James directed investigators to interview Rich Azzopardi, a senior adviser to Cuomo, about the reported sexual harassment allegations against Cuomo from over a decade ago to the present.

On August 3, 2021, Letitia James released an investigation report which accused Cuomo of sexually harassment against Lindsey Boylan, Charlotte Bennett, Anna Ruch, Ana Liss, Alyssa McGrath, Virginia Limmiatis, aide Kaitlin (last name withheld), an unnamed executive assistant (identified as Brittany Commisso by CBS News), an unnamed New York State trooper and two unnamed state entity employees. The investigation concluded that Cuomo's behavior included unwanted groping, kissing and sexual comments, and also found that Cuomo's office had engaged in illegal retaliation against Boylan for her allegation against him. Cuomo responded to the report with a denial: "I never touched anyone inappropriately."

Impeachment investigation 
Later, State Assembly Speaker Carl Heastie approved the State Assembly's judiciary committee's request to initiate an impeachment investigation into the allegations. James said the impeachment investigation would have "no bearing" on her own investigation.

The first step in impeaching a sitting New York governor after the drafting of the articles of impeachment is a simple majority vote in the State Assembly to approve the articles. 76 out of the 150 members would need to vote to approve the articles. The trial in the State Senate would occur next. 62 out of the 63 members would act as jurors (Majority Leader Andrea Stewart-Cousins would have to recuse herself because she is in the line of succession as the Temporary President of the State Senate, which coincides with the position of Majority Leader). The 7 judges of the New York Court of Appeals, New York's highest court, would also be jurors in the trial. There would need to be a 2/3 majority of those 69 jurors to convict which would be 46.

Before Cuomo resigned, both the Assembly and State Senate had the votes to impeach and remove him from office.

Criminal investigation 
On October 28, 2021, a spokesman for the state court system announced that Cuomo would be charged with misdemeanor "sex crime," for forcible touching, in the Albany City Court. Albany County Sheriff Craig Apple’s office would file a criminal complaint against Cuomo in connection with Brittany Commisso’s allegation. On January 4, 2022, however, Albany County District Attorney David Soares announced that he would not prosecute Cuomo and asked a Judge to dismiss the criminal complaint due to lack of evidence. Soars stated that “While we found the complainant in this case cooperative and credible, after review of all the available evidence, we have concluded that we cannot meet our burden at trial.” Soares also said his office considered other potential criminal charges, but none fit the allegations. On January 7, 2022, Judge Holly Drexler officially accepted the dismissal of the criminal complaint against Cuomo. On January 31, 2022, the last of the five criminal inquiries which had been pursued against Cuomo, this time involving accuser Virginia Limmiatis, was dismissed in Oswego County due to insufficient evidence.

Political impact 
Many news organizations and political pundits proposed that the allegations, combined with Cuomo's simultaneous scandal of allegedly covering up COVID-19 nursing home deaths, could severely diminish Cuomo's chances of re-election in the 2022 gubernatorial election. A poll from the Quinnipiac University Polling Institute released on March 4, 2021, showed that 45% of New Yorkers approved of Cuomo's job performance, as opposed to 46% of New Yorkers who disapproved. Earlier, in May 2020, 72% of voters had approved of Cuomo's job performance, while 24% disapproved. The same poll found that 36% of New Yorkers wanted Cuomo to run for re-election, whereas 59% did not.

Republicans successfully encouraged Lee Zeldin, a U.S. Representative from New York's 1st congressional district, to run in the gubernatorial election due to the scandals. Republican businessman John Catsimatidis, who had previously mulled a New York City mayoral run, was now considering a gubernatorial run given Cuomo's weakened approval.

The scandal also raised considerations that several Democrats could run against Cuomo in the primary; potential challengers included Lieutenant Governor Kathy Hochul (who replaced him once he left office), Attorney General Letitia James (who is investigating him), Mayor of New York City Bill de Blasio, New York City Public Advocate Jumaane Williams, New York State Comptroller Tom DiNapoli, State Senator Alessandra Biaggi, and U.S. Representative Alexandria Ocasio-Cortez.

See also 
New York COVID-19 nursing home scandal

Notes

References

External links
 Report of investigation into allegations of sexual harassment by Governor Andrew M. Cuomo by the Office of The Attorney General, State of New York
 Position statement of Governor Andrew M. Cuomo concerning the sexual harassment allegations made against him by Rita M. Glavin, Attorney for Governor Andrew M. Cuomo

2021 controversies in the United States
2021 in New York (state)
2021 scandals
sexual
Mass media-related controversies in the United States
Political scandals in New York (state)
Sexual harassment in the United States
Cuomo
State and local political sex scandals in the United States